Luminous may refer to:

 Luminous flame, a flame emitting visible light

Music
 Luminous (group), a South Korean boy band
 Luminous (EP), an EP by Cesium 137
 Luminous (John Hicks and Elise Wood album), 1985–88
 Luminous (The Horrors album)
 Luminous, an album by Chris Murphy
 Luminous, an album by Bill Nelson
 "Luminous" (ClariS song), 2012
 Luminous (Jedward song), 2012

Other uses
 Luminous (book), a 1998 short story collection by Greg Egan
 Luminous (typeface), a foundry type made by Ludwig & Mayer
 Luminous Studio, a video game engine developed by Square Enix
 Project Luminous, a project by the Walt Disney Corporation that became the sub franchise Star Wars: High Republic

See also

 Luminance
 Luminescence
 Luminosity
 Lumines, a video game